South East European Media Observatory is a regional network of regional organisations whose aim is to enhance media freedom and pluralism, and to influence media reforms in South East Europe. It addresses those impediments to democratic development for free media systems. It provides a regional instrument for media research and monitoring, as well as it supports investigative journalism and civil society engagement. The South East European Media Observatory offers a regional framework for debates, consultations and coalitions among main stakeholders.

In particular, in 2013 and 2014 the SEE Media Observatory concentrated on media integrity in Albania, Bosnia and Herzegovina, Croatia, Macedonia and Serbia.

Partners of the project

Project partners are: 
Albanian Media Institute (Albania); 
Media and Civil Society Development Foundation „Mediacentar” (Bosnia and Herzegovina);
Investigative Journalism Center (Croatia);
Center for Independent Journalism (Hungary);
Press Council of Kosovo (Kosovo);
Macedonian Institute for Media (Macedonia);
Montenegro Media Institute (Montenegro);
Novi Sad School of Journalism (Serbia);
Peace Institute (Slovenia);
P24 – Platform for Independent Journalism (Turkey).

References

External links
http://mediaobservatory.net/about
http://www.novinarska-skola.org.rs/sr/?p=2510&lang=en
http://europeanjournalists.org/blog/2016/06/14/alternatives-for-south-east-europe-media-reforms/

Communications and media organizations